It All Started at the End is a 2015 Colombian documentary film directed by Luis Ospina.
It premiered at the Toronto International Film Festival on 13 September 2015

Synopsis
In the 1970s and '80s Colombia was characterized by violence from drug cartels to guerilla warfare. During the same period director Luis Ospina and group of filmmakers, artists, and writers gathered in Cali to create an alternative vision of Colombian society.

References

External links 

2015 documentary films
Colombian documentary films